Wang Feng (born 29 June 1971 in Beijing) is a Chinese rock musician and composer. He was the founder and lead vocals of the rock band No. 43 Baojia Street. He also composed the music for Wang Xiaoshuai's 2001 film Beijing Bicycle.

After two albums No. 43 Baojia Street (1997) and No. 43 Baojia Street 2 (1998), he signed a solo contract with Warner Music Beijing Co., Ltd. The third album Fireworks (2000) was the beginning of his solo career. With a number of songs like Flying Higher (飞得更高) (2004), and Blooming Life (怒放的生命) (2005) on his following albums, Wang Feng entered the media spotlight and became popular in China. His 2009 album Belief Flies in the Wind won him an award as the Most Popular Male Singer in China at the Channel V's 14th Chinese Music Awards. He is also a coach on The Voice of China, and Sing! China, both TV shows which helped him gain immense popularity.

Early life
Wang Feng was born in Beijing to a musicians' family. Under his father's suggestion, Wang started practicing violin when he was five years old. He attended the middle school attached to the Central Conservatory of Music at the age of eleven. Wang did not understand the purpose of playing violin, or why he had to stay home practising while other kids of his age could play outside. At the age of 14, for the first time in his life, Wang realized the beauty of music through a piece composed by Tchaikovsky. After that experience, Wang decided to pursue music for the rest of his life.

By the age of 17, Wang started listening to rock music. Wang studied in the Central Conservatory of Music majoring in violin and viola. In his college years Wang joined the Chinese Youth Orchestra and performed overseas. In his senior year in college (1994), Wang and his friends formed the band No. 43 Baojia Street.

Career

With No. 43 Baojia Street 
Wang Feng and the band No. 43 Baojia Street (鲍家街43号), which was named after the street address of the Central Conservatory of Music in Beijing. They released their first album in 1997, three years after the band was formed. During these three years the band practiced in a basement in the college and performed in local clubs and bars. To comply with his father's will and to have a stable income, Wang took the offer of the vice concertmaster of the National Ballet of China Symphony Orchestra. However Wang quit the job after a year even with a promotion of the concertmaster position, and put himself completely into Rock music. In the beginning, the band was sponsored by "Xiao Wei" (nickname), an alumnus of the Central Conservatory of Music. Xiao Wei's sponsorship allowed the band to practice and perform. They gradually built up their reputation in Beijing, which led the band to a record deal from Beijing Jingwen Record Co., Ltd on 31 May 1997. The band was not profitable under Xiao Wei's sponsorship. Wang could not even pay his rent at that time. The record deal with Beijing Jingwen Record was an opportunity for the band to officially enter the music business and to solve the money issue. Xiao Wei understood the benefit of the deal for Wang Feng and the whole band. He terminated the sponsorship himself and left Beijing.

Later that year the band made their first studio album, No. 43 Baojia Street (1997). This album included songs like "Little Bird" and "Good Night Beijing", which became famous afterwards. One year later the band made their second album, No. 43 Baojia Street 2 – Storm Approaching (1998). While the albums were sold in the market, the economic issue of the band and Wang himself did not resolve. In other words, the band was not making a profit. Wang decided to terminate the contract with Beijing Jingwen Record. In 2000, the Warner Music Beijing Co., Ltd found Wang Feng and offered him a record deal but not the whole band. Wang signed the contract and put out the album Fireworks (2000) in the same year. The songs from this album were made before the band broke up.

Solo years

With Warner Music and Feng Sheng Music 

During his years with Warner Music, Wang had the boost of his career. Three albums were made, including Fireworks (2000), Love is a Happy Bullet (2002), and Crying while Smiling (2004). The song Flying Higher, which became very popular in China after release, was included in the album Crying while Smiling. Wang also took care of the entire soundtrack of the movie Beijing Bicycle (2001). In July 2005, Wang ended the five-year contract with Warner Music and started his own independent record label "Feng Sheng Music" (Feng Sheng is the Chinese translation for Feng's voice). In the same year, Wang released his fourth studio album "Blooming Life" (2005). The song Blooming life, same as the name of the album, became famous quickly after the album was released and became the most downloaded ringtones in some regions in China. In the same album, Wang included another two famous patriotic pieces, Our Dream (《我们的梦》) and I Love You, China (《我爱你，中国》). Our Dream became the Beijing Olympic Top 10 Golden Songs; I Love You, China was considered a gift for the success of Shenzhou 6, the second human spaceflight of the People's Republic of China. In 2006 Wang was awarded the Pepsi Chart "Best Male Singer in China".

With Music Nation Group 

In May 2007, Wang made a new record deal with the Hong Kong media company MusicNationGroup. One month later, Wang released his fifth studio album Brave Heart (2007). Wang claimed to be very satisfied with his work in this album, however one of the tracks was forced to be taken out by the authority. During the time the album was released, some people on the Internet claimed that the hit song Brave Heart was a copy of the song Crazy from the Canadian pop-punk band Simple Plan. Wang's response was, "I do not need to copy other people's work. It's just as simple as that. I do not need to do that at all."

In 2009, after two years since the last album, Wang came back with the Belief Flies in the Wind (2009). The album brought Wang many awards. The song In Spring became No.1 on the 23rd of the Chinese Music Chart. In September, the song Light took the No.1 place again on the 32nd of the Chinese Music Chart. On 12 November, the song When I Miss You won the No.1 on the 42nd of the Chinese Music Chart. On the 9th Global Chinese Music Awards, the song In Spring won the Best Lyrics award. Wang Feng himself won the Best Producer, and the album Belief Flies in the Wind won the Best Album. In an interview with Changjiang Business Journal, Wang claimed that "This album is meant to let everyone to understand the true rock music. It's not about what the majority like or what's popular. I'm making mainstream rock music, and that's what I stand for."

With Rock Forward 
In 2011, after being signed to Rock Forward Entertainment, Wang Feng released Life Asks for Nothing, the first ever double album in Chinese rock history, which phenomenally topped a wide variety of charts and earned him nationwide critical acclaims on the major Chinese music awards. The same year Wang Feng became the first ever Chinese artist who held concerts in grand stadiums twice a year, which again has proved that he is one of very few Chinese rock musicians who enjoy commercial success and mainstream recognition without discarding the famously rebellious roots. His uncompromisingly keen passion for life and independent spirit have radically altered the parameters of Chinese rock scene and have left a deep mark on Chinese popular culture for him as the true inspiring voice of his generation.

In 2013, Wang Feng became a coach in The Voice of China Season 2, with Na Ying, Harlem Yu, and A-Mei Zhang. He continued to be a coach even till Season 4.

In 2016, Wang Feng became a coach in the first season of the rebranded Sing! China, where he became the winning mentor courtesy of Jiang Dunhao, who won the series. He did not return for another season in season 2 the following year.

In 2018, Wang Feng was one of the seven first-round singers taking part in the sixth season of Hunan Television's singing competition Singer (which was previously named I Am a Singer). He made it to the finals and finished third, behind Hua Chenyu and winner Jessie J.

Personal life 
Wang is often criticized for his promiscuous nature and cheating behaviour.

His first wife was Qi Dan, a TV hostess. In 2004, he began a relationship with model Ge Huijie when she was aged 17; they have one daughter, Wang Manxi (born 2005). In 2007, he married his second wife, Kang Zuoru. They have one daughter, Wang Jingyi (born 2012). They divorced when their daughter was only 8 months old, due to Wang's cheating. He married for a third time in 2015 to Chinese actress Zhang Ziyi. They have a daughter, Wang Xingxing (born 2015) and a son (born 2020). Both children were born in the United States.

Discography

No. 43 Baojia Street (鲍家街43号) 

 No. 43 Baojia Street (鲍家街43号) (1997)
 No. 43 Baojia Street 2 – Storm Approaching (鲍家街43号 2 – 风暴来临) (1998)

Studio albums 

 Fireworks (花火) (2000)
 Love is a Happiness Bullet (爱是一颗幸福的子弹) (2002)
 Crying with Laughter (笑着哭) (2004)
 A Blooming Life (怒放的生命) (2005)
 Brave Heart (勇敢的心) (2007)
 Belief Flies in the Wind (信仰在空中飘扬) (2009)
 Life Asks for Nothing (生无所求) (2011)
 Born in Hesitation (生来彷徨) (2013)
 The River (河流) (2015)
 29, Guoling Lane (果岭里29号) (2017)
 2020 (2020) (2020)
 Maybe I can ignore death (2022)

Movie soundtracks 

 Beijing Bicycle (十七岁的单车) (2001)
 Wolf Totem (沧浪之歌) (2015)

See also
 Chinese rock

External links

 Wang Feng's blog (Chinese)

References

1971 births
Living people
Chinese rock musicians
Chinese male singer-songwriters
Singers from Beijing
21st-century Chinese male singers